Neon Flesh is a 2010 neo-noir thriller with comedy elements film directed by Paco Cabezas which stars Mario Casas alongside Vicente Romero, Macarena Gómez,  Blanca Suárez, and Ángela Molina. It is a Spanish-Argentine-Swedish-French co-production.

Plot 
Ricky's mama just got out of jail. He has spent years relating to people of all kinds due to his life on the street and that makes him have in mind the project of setting up a hostess club so that his mother is the boss and thus stop practicing prostitution directly, the "Hiroshima Club ".

But things are not easy and he will have to face multiple obstacles until he can achieve it. He will have the help of a pimp, a thug and a transvestite to achieve it.

Cast

Production 
The film is based on a short film of the same name directed by Paco Cabezas.  Some cast members from the short film reprised their roles in the full-length film (notable exceptions were Óscar Jaenada and Victoria Abril, respectively replaced by Mario Casas and Ángela Molina).

A co-production among companies from Spain, Argentina, Sweden and France, the film was produced by s Morena Films alongside Jaleo Films, Oberon Cinematográfica, Mandarin Films, Hepp Films and Pensa&Rocca, with the participation of Canal Sur, TVC, TVV, TVG, and ETB. Shooting locations in Spain included Seville whereas shooting locations in Argentina included Belgrano (Buenos Aires). Crew during the Argentine part of the filming used masks due to the 2009 swine flu pandemic alert.

Release 
The film was presented at the Sitges Film Festival on 9 October 2010.

Distributed by Vértice Cine, it was theatrically released in Spain on 21 January 2011. It opened in Argentine theatres on 21 February 2013.

Reception 
Jonathan Holland of Variety assessed that the "hugely entertaining" film "reps crude, violent, flashy and sentimental fare, but with a sharp, intelligent edge that gets it out of jail".

Jesús Palacios of Fotogramas rated the film 3 out of 5 stars highlighting the honesty of the proposal whilst pointing out its "cinephagic naivety", assessing that "however irregular it sometimes appears, [it is] one of the most refreshing Spanish films of the year".

See also 
 List of Spanish films of 2011
 List of Argentine films of 2013

References

External links 
 Neon Flesh at ICAA's Catálogo de Cinespañol

2010 thriller films
2010s Spanish-language films
Films shot in Buenos Aires
Films shot in the province of Seville
Spanish thriller films
Argentine thriller films
Swedish thriller films
French thriller films
Features based on short films
Films directed by Paco Cabezas
2010s Spanish films
2010s French films
2010s Argentine films
2010s Swedish films